"A Song for Mama" is a number-one R&B single by the American R&B group Boyz II Men. The tune, which was written and produced by Babyface, served as the theme song to the 1997 motion picture Soul Food, and spent two weeks at number one on the US R&B chart. To date, it is their 11th and last top 10 hit, peaking at number seven on the Billboard Hot 100. The song also appears on the group's fourth album, Evolution (1997).

Critical reception
Larry Flick from Billboard stated, "The second single from Evolution can also be heard on the soundtrack to Soul Food. It's a tear-tugging ode to mothers, delivered with the kind of seamless harmonies that one has come to expect from these Boyz. Producer/writer Babyface's fingerprints are all over the track, from its delicate piano lines to its soft but insinuating percussion. There's no denying that this act is at its best when the members are wrapping their voices around a Babyface composition. If you still need proof, let quietly emotional lines like "loving you is like food for my soul" wash over your senses. As the world inches closer to the holiday season, look for this single to become a sentimental favorite at every possible radio format."

Track listings

 US single
 A Song for Mama (Radio Edit) 	4:30 	
 A Song for Mama (LP Version) 	5:02 	
 A Song for Mama (Instrumental) 	5:05

 US live version single
 A Song for Mama – Live Version (Radio Edit) 4:11 	
 A Song for Mama – Live Version (Main Version) 5:10 	

 Europe promo CD
 A Song for Mama (Radio Edit) 	4:30

 Europe single
 A Song for Mama (Radio Edit) 		
 A Song for Mama (LP Version)

 Europe maxi-CD
 A Song for Mama (Radio Edit) 	4:30 	
 I'll Make Love To You (LP Version) 	3:57 	
 Motownphilly (LP Version) 	3:56 	
 Sympin' (Remix Radio Edit) 	3:58

 Europe maxi-CD 2
 A Song for Mama (Radio Edit) 	4:30 	
 A Song for Mama (LP Version) 	5:02 	
 Baby C'Mon (LP Version) 	4:36 	
 A Song for Mama (Instrumental) 	5:05

Credits and personnel
Credits adapted from the liner notes of Evolution.

Boyz II Men: all vocals
Babyface: writer, composer, producer, keyboards and drum programming
Greg Phillinganes: piano
Nathan East: bass
Michael Thompson: guitar
Brad Gilderman, Manny Marroquin, Paul Boutin: recording engineers
Jon Gass: mix engineer
Paul Boutin: assistant mix engineer
Randy Walker: midi programmer
Ivy Skoff: production coordinator

Charts

Weekly charts

Year-end charts

Certifications

See also
List of number-one R&B singles of 1997 (U.S.)
List of number-one R&B singles of 1998 (U.S.)

References

Songs about mothers
1997 singles
Boyz II Men songs
Songs written for films
Song recordings produced by Babyface (musician)
Songs written by Babyface (musician)
Motown singles
1997 songs
Contemporary R&B ballads